Muslimin bin Yahaya (Jawi مسلمين بن يحيى; born 13 July 1967) is a Malaysian politician who has served as Member of Parliament (MP) for Sungai Besar since May 2018. He served as the Deputy Minister of Entrepreneur Development and Cooperative in the Barisan Nasional (BN) administration under former Prime Minister Ismail Sabri Yaakob and former Minister Noh Omar from August 2021 to the collapse of the BN administration in November 2022 and Deputy Minister of Education I in the Perikatan Nasional (PN) administration under former Prime Minister Muhyiddin Yassin and former Minister Mohd Radzi Md Jidin from March 2020 to the collapse of PN administration in August 2021. He is a member of the Malaysian United Indigenous Party (BERSATU), a component party of the PN coalition and former component party of the Pakatan Harapan (PH) coalition and was a member of the United Malays National Organisation (UMNO), a component party of the Barisan Nasional (BN) coalition. After the defeat of BN to PH in 2018 general election, he resigned from UMNO in 2018 and joined BERSATU in 2019.

Personal life

He was born in Parit 8 Gambut, Sungai Panjang, Sungai Besar, Selangor on 13 July 1967 and married his partner, Hanisah Paiman.

Career 

He was previously appointed Senior Secretariat to Tan Sri Noriah Kasnon in Ministry of Plantation Industries and Commodities in 2014.

Election results

Honours 
  :
  Member of the Order of the Defender of the Realm (AMN) (2015)
  :
  Commander of the Order of the Territorial Crown (PMW) – Datuk (2022)

References 

1967 births
Living people
People from Selangor
Malaysian people of Malay descent
Malaysian Muslims
Malaysian United Indigenous Party politicians
Former United Malays National Organisation politicians
Government ministers of Malaysia
21st-century Malaysian politicians
Members of the Order of the Defender of the Realm